Angeneh (also Romanized as Anganeh; also known as  Angyan and Angyana) is a village in Nazlu-e Shomali Rural District, Nazlu District, Urmia County, West Azerbaijan Province, Iran. At the 2006 census, its population was 628, in 168 families.

References 

Populated places in Urmia County